Colby Stevenson (born October 3, 1997) is an American freestyle skier.

He participated at the slopestyle at the FIS Nordic World Ski Championships 2021, winning a medal.

He competed at the 2022 Winter Olympics, winning silver in the Men's big air event.

References

External links

Instagram page of Colby Stevenson

Living people
1997 births
American male freestyle skiers
People from Portsmouth, New Hampshire
Sportspeople from Rockingham County, New Hampshire
Freestyle skiers at the 2022 Winter Olympics
Medalists at the 2022 Winter Olympics
Olympic silver medalists for the United States in freestyle skiing
X Games athletes